The People's Republic of the Congo competed at the 1980 Summer Olympics in Moscow, USSR.
The nation returned to the Olympic Games after boycotting the 1976 Summer Olympics.

Results by event

Athletics
Men's 100 metres
Théophile Nkounkou
 Heat — 10.53
 Quarterfinals — 10.59 (→ did not advance)
 Antoine Kiakouama
 Heat — 10.69 (→ did not advance)

Men's 200 metres
 Théophile Nkounkou
 Heat — did not start (→ did not advance)

Men's Marathon
 Emmanuel Mpioh
 Final — 2:48:17 (→ 52nd place)

Men's 110 m Hurdles
 Bernard Mabikana
 Heat — 15.42 (→ did not advance)

Boxing
Men's Lightweight (60 kg)
 Alphonse Matoubela
 First Round — Lost to Tibor Dezamits (Hungary) on points (0-5)

Handball

Women's Team Competition
 Preliminary Round Robin
Lost to Soviet Union (30-11) 
Lost to Hungary (39-10) 
Lost to GDR (28-6) 
Lost to Czechoslovakia (23-10) 
Lost to Yugoslavia (39-9) → 6th place
Team Roster 
Angélique Abemane
Isabelle Azanga
Pascaline Bobeka
Germaine Djimbi
Yolande Kada-Gango
Henriette Koula
Solange Koulinka
Pemba Lopez
Yvonne Makouala
Julienne Malaki
Madeleine Mitsotso
Nicole Oba
Micheline Okemba
Viviane Okoula

References
 Official Olympic Reports

External links
 

Nations at the 1980 Summer Olympics
1980
1980 in the Republic of the Congo